Rarities is a compilation album of rare and unreleased material by the British rock band Atomic Rooster.

Whilst being a very good compilation for fans of the band, it includes several unlicensed tracks whose copyright is owned variously by Elektra, EMI, Sanctuary (who purchased the B&C and Dawn catalogues) and Polydor Records. While it is 'endorsed' by former band member John Du Cann, he does not actually own the rights to the 'Atomic Rooster' name; this resides with the estate of late founder member Vincent Crane. Also, although not credited, drummer Preston Heyman appears on the demo versions of the songs that appeared on the 1980 self-titled album.

Track listing
"Moonrise" (Du Cann) 1:06 – edited "End of the Day" (alternate/demo version) intro; featured in full on The Best of Atomic Rooster Volumes 1 & 2
"Atomic Alert" (Du Cann) 0:34 – US 1950s B-movie style radio ad 1971
"Death Walks Behind You" (Du Cann, Crane) 5:35 - live studio version 1981
"VUG" (Crane) 4:33 - demo with Carl Palmer 1970
"Broken Window" (Du Cann) 3:47 - unreleased intended single B-side 1980
"Alien Alert" (Du Cann) 0:28 – US alien spoof radio ad 1971
"Throw Your Life Away" (Du Cann, Crane) 2:49 - mislabelled 'different mix'; actually standard B-side version 1980
"Devil’s Alert" (Du Cann) 0:26 – US radio ad 1971
"Devil’s Answer" (Du Cann) 4:00 - demo with Carl Palmer 1970
"Do You Know Who’s Looking for You?" (Du Cann, Crane) 2:42 - demo 1980
"Don’t Lose Your Mind" (Du Cann) 3:32 - demo 1980
"He Did it Again" (Du Cann, Crane) 3:40 - demo 1980
"Backward/Forward Revealed" (Du Cann) 0:28 - intro to "Nobody Else" from Death Walks Behind You played backwards and forwards. This track consists of a chant containing two expletives with reference to "R.M". R.M. was Robert Masters, the band's manager at the time. The purpose of the track was to reveal a hidden meaning which was not obvious to most listeners.
"End of the Day" (Du Cann) 3:45 - edited, over-modulated alternate/demo version; featured in full on The Best of Atomic Rooster Volumes 1 & 2
"Lost in Space" (Du Cann, Crane) 3:42 - demo 1980
"Hold it Through the Night" (Du Cann) 3:10 - unreleased track 1981
"No Change by Me" (Du Cann) 3:15 - unreleased track 1981
"Play it Again" (Du Cann, Crane) 3:58 - demo 1981
"I Can’t Take No More" (Du Cann) 8:57 - live at the Marquee 1980

Atomic Rooster compilation albums
2000 compilation albums
Angel Air albums